Jerry Herbert Tokofsky (born April 14, 1936) is an American agent, film producer, and studio executive.

Early life
Tokofsky was born in New York City, the son of Julius H. Tokofsky and his wife Rose Trager.

Career
Tokofsky began his connection with the film business as an agent, and by the 1960s had become a studio executive at Columbia Pictures. In 1966, he was a vice-president of Columbia. He then produced films for the studio. 

Harrison Ford had an early onscreen role as a bellhop in Dead Heat on a Merry-Go-Round (1966), on which Tokovsky worked. In 1967, Mike Frankovich assigned the review of Ford’s contract with Columbia to Tokovsky, and he terminated it, telling Ford that when Tony Curtis delivered a bag of groceries, he did it like a movie star. He added “You ain’t got it, kid!”

By 1968, Tokofsky had become head of Columbia’s creative affairs department, which had the tasks of evaluating scripts and overseeing actors, directors, and producers. He took on Peter Guber as his assistant and later spoke warmly of Guber’s usefulness to him. 

By the early 1970s, Tokofsky was producing films for United Artists and others. Born to Win (1971) was the first film by a production company founded by Tokofsky and George Segal.

In the 1980s, Tokofsky was working in the 20th Century Fox television department. One evening, Harrison Ford was dining in the 20th Century Fox Commissary, and a waiter brought him a salver with Tokofsky‘s card on it, on which was written “I missed my shot.” Ford turned around to see where Tokofsky was and found with some pleasure that he could no longer recognize him.

In 1986, at the suggestion of Irvin Kershner, Tokofsky and Stanley Zupnik paid David Mamet one million dollars for the film rights to his award-winning play Glengarry Glen Ross, but it took them several years to raise the money to make the film, as no major studio would touch it.

Personal life
On February 21, 1956, Tokofsky married Myrna Weinstein, and before divorcing they had two sons; in 1970 he married secondly Fiammetta Bettuzzi, and they had a daughter, but this also ended in divorce; thirdly on October 4, 1981, he married Karen Oliver.

Films
Producer, Dead Heat on a Merry-Go-Round (1966) 
Producer (with Marvin Worth), Where's Poppa? (United Artists, 1970)
Executive producer, Born to Win (UA, 1971)
Producer and writer, The Second Time Around (TV pilot, ABC, 1979)
Executive producer, Paternity (Paramount, 1981)
Co-producer (with Bruce Cohn Curtis), Dreamscape (Twentieth Century-Fox, 1984)
Co-producer (with Bruce Cohn Curtis), Fear City (Chevy Chase , 1984)
Producer (with Hunt Lowry), Wildfire (Zupnik Cinema Group, 1988)
Producer, Glengarry Glen Ross (New Line Cinema, 1992)
Producer, The Grass Harp (1995)

Notes

External links

Jerry Tokofsky, Rotten Tomatoes

1936 births
20th Century Studios people
American film producers
Columbia Pictures people
Film producers from New York (state)
People from New York City
Living people